The Battery H, 1st West Virginia Light Artillery Regiment was an artillery battery that served in the Union Army during the American Civil War.

Service
Battery H was raised at Maryland Heights, Maryland on January 4, 1864.

Battery H was mustered out on July 11, 1865.

Casualties

The 1st West Virginia Light Artillery Regiment lost 33 men, killed and died of wounds; 131 men, died of disease, accident or in prison; total deaths, 164 men. (all 8 batteries)

[Source: Regimental Losses in the American Civil War, 1861–1865, by William F. Fox]

Commander
Cpt James H. Holmes

References
The Civil War Archive

See also
West Virginia Units in the Civil War
West Virginia in the Civil War

Units and formations of the Union Army from West Virginia
Artillery units and formations of the American Civil War
1864 establishments in West Virginia
Military units and formations established in 1864
Military units and formations disestablished in 1865